Game theory studies strategic interaction between individuals in situations called games.  Classes of these games have been given names.  This is a list of the most commonly studied games

Explanation of features

Games can have several features, a few of the most common are listed here.
Number of players:  Each person who makes a choice in a game or who receives a payoff from the outcome of those choices is a player.
Strategies per player:  In a game each player chooses from a set of possible actions, known as pure strategies.  If the number is the same for all players, it is listed here.
Number of pure strategy Nash equilibria: A Nash equilibrium is a set of strategies which represents mutual best responses to the other strategies.  In other words, if every player is playing their part of a Nash equilibrium, no player has an incentive to unilaterally change their strategy.  Considering only situations where players play a single strategy without randomizing (a pure strategy) a game can have any number of Nash equilibria.
Sequential game: A game is sequential if one player performs their actions after another player; otherwise, the game is a simultaneous move game.
Perfect information: A game has perfect information if it is a sequential game and every player knows the strategies chosen by the players who preceded them.
Constant sum: A game is a constant sum game if the sum of the payoffs to every player are the same for every single set of strategies.  In these games, one player gains if and only if another player loses. A constant sum game can be converted into a zero sum game by subtracting a fixed value from all payoffs, leaving their relative order unchanged.
Move by nature: A game includes a random move by nature.

List of games

External links

 List of games from gametheory.net

Notes

References
 Arthur, W. Brian “Inductive Reasoning and Bounded Rationality”, American Economic Review (Papers and Proceedings), 84,406-411, 1994.
 Bolton, Katok, Zwick 1998, "Dictator game giving: Rules of fairness versus acts of kindness" International Journal of Game Theory, Volume 27, Number 2
 Gibbons, Robert (1992) A Primer in Game Theory, Harvester Wheatsheaf
 Glance, Huberman. (1994) "The dynamics of social dilemmas." Scientific American.
H. W. Kuhn, Simplified Two-Person Poker; in H. W. Kuhn and A. W. Tucker (editors), Contributions to the Theory of Games, volume 1, pages 97–103, Princeton University Press, 1950.
 Martin J. Osborne & Ariel Rubinstein: A Course in Game Theory (1994).
 McKelvey, R. and T. Palfrey (1992) "An experimental study of the centipede game," Econometrica 60(4), 803-836.
 Nash, John (1950) "The Bargaining Problem" Econometrica 18: 155-162.
 Ochs, J. and A.E. Roth (1989) "An Experimental Study of Sequential Bargaining" American Economic Review 79: 355-384.
Rapoport, A. (1966) The game of chicken, American Behavioral Scientist 10: 10-14.
Rasmussen, Eric: Games and Information, 2004
 

 
 Shubik, Martin "The Dollar Auction Game: A Paradox in Noncooperative Behavior and Escalation," The Journal of Conflict Resolution, 15, 1, 1971, 109-111.
 Sinervo, B., and Lively, C. (1996). "The Rock-Paper-Scissors Game and the evolution of alternative male strategies". Nature Vol.380, pp. 240–243
 Skyrms, Brian. (2003) The stag hunt and Evolution of Social Structure Cambridge: Cambridge University Press.